The Third Symphony by Alfred Schnittke was his fourth composition in the symphonic form, completed in 1981.

Like its predecessor, it is in four movements: an opening Moderato, followed by an Allegro and a relatively brief movement marked Allegro pesante, with the lengthy finale marked Adagio. At around 50 minutes, it is Schnittke's third longest symphony, after the First and Second symphonies.

It shares an intensity similar to the First Symphony, but unlike that work has a more traditional form, and contains no direct quotations. Nonetheless, the influence of many composers hangs over the piece (Richard Taruskin called the opening of the work "Wagner's Rheingold prelude, cubed and cubed again."), not merely stylistically but in Schnittke's repeated use of composers' initials. These include Bach, Handel, Mozart, Schoenberg, Stockhausen and Hans Werner Henze. Further use is made of transposed words later in the work: in the third movement the word "das Böse" ("the Evil") appears as an eight-note tone row (D, A, E flat, A flat, B flat, E, E flat, E), with the B-A-C-H monogram dominating the final movement.

The work was premiered in Leipzig on 5 November 1981, with Kurt Masur conducting the Leipzig Gewandhausorchester in Schnittke's presence. It was first recorded in 1984 by Gennadi Rozhdestvensky with the USSR Ministry of Culture Symphony Orchestra. Further recordings appeared in the 1990s with the Royal Stockholm Philharmonic Orchestra under Eri Klas and in 2015 with the Rundfunk-Sinfonieorchester Berlin under Vladimir Jurowski (PENTATONE PTC 5186485).

Instrumentation
The symphony is scored for a large orchestra consisting of 4 flutes (all doubling piccolos), 4 oboes (4th doubling cor anglais), 4 clarinets (3rd doubling piccolo clarinet, 4th doubling bass clarinet), 4 bassoons (4th doubling contrabassoon), 6 horns, 4 trumpets, 4 trombones (4th doubling contrabass trombone), tuba, timpani, 2 tam-tams, vibraphone, marimba, bells, glockenspiel, electric guitar, bass guitar, 2 harps, piano, harpsichord, organ, celesta, and strings (16-16-12-12-10)

The symphony consists of four movements  :

 Moderato
 Allegro
 Allegro pesante
 Adagio

The duration of the symphony is approximately 50 minutes.

References

1981 compositions
Symphonies by Alfred Schnittke